Lycée Anna de Noailles is a senior high school in Évian-les-Bains, France.

 it had 950 students, including 120 adults. 90 of its students were boarding students.

References

External links
 Lycée Anna de Noailles 
  
 La restructuration du lycée Anna de Noailles - Evian Les Bains - CAUE74 (architectural firm) 
Lycées in Haute-Savoie